So Weird is a television series that aired on the Disney Channel as a mid-season replacement from January 18, 1999, to September 28, 2001. The series was shot in Vancouver, British Columbia. In the first two seasons, the series centered on the teenage Fiona Phillips (Cara DeLizia) who toured with her rock-star mom (Mackenzie Phillips), while encountering paranormal activity along the way. The series was compared to the Fox TV series The X-Files since it took a darker tone than any other Disney Channel show at the time. For the third and final season, Disney replaced DeLizia (due to her wanting to pursue future projects outside of Disney) with actress Alexz Johnson playing Annie Thelen. Production ceased after 65 episodes.

Plot

Season 1 
The season begins by introducing the main characters, starting with the protagonist in the series, Fiona Phillips, who narrates an introduction to the episode's paranormal topic before the main title sequence.

Fiona explains that she lives on a tour bus with her well-known rockstar mother Molly, who is touring to get back on the rock and roll scene after the death of her husband, who was also her musical partner. Fiona's brother, Jack, Molly's band manager, Irene, Irene's husband Ned, and Ned and Irene's son, Clu also live with them on the tour bus, which Ned drives.

Stringing together all of Fi's paranormal encounters was her search to communicate with her father, who died when she was three years old. Fi first "encounters” her father in the second episode titled "Web Sight" where an unknown force sends her internet articles warning her of the future. From alien invasions, time warps and ghosts, Fi faced 13 episodes worth of paranormal activity. Also encountered: one powerful tulpa, a Bigfoot, angels and more significantly, the Will o' the Wisp. The season finale featured Jack becoming possessed by a hyperactive Scottish Will o' the Wisp, also known as a Spunkie. The Spunkie told Fi she could save her brother from his control by speaking his one true name, which was only seven letters. Fi found the spirit's one true name, Bricriu, therefore saving her brother. Bricriu had offered to protect Fi from evil spirits who had battled her father and had also offered to give her contact with her late father in return for being allowed to possess her brother. She thought he was lying therefore rejected his offer. He reappears in later episodes to keep her away from other spirits and people who claims are a threat to her, depending on how one reads it, this may be seen as evidence he was telling the truth but this is questionable at best, especially since in one episode he tried to prevent her from talking to a person who knew her father and wanted to give her information.

Season 2 
The second season is darker than the first, playing out over twenty-six episodes compared with the shorter first season with exactly half of this amount. Picking up where last season left off, Molly and the band take time off the tour to record an album. Fi and friend Candy meet a medium who is proven to be a fraud. Ironically, another medium reveals the fake one and assists Fi in contacting her father through music on his old guitar.

Clu is accepted to and goes off to college, reducing his role and introducing his brother Carey. Similar to the previous season, Fi and her gang face another round of legendary creatures including vampires, werewolves, banshees, trolls, sirens and merfolk. In a pivotal episode, Fi discovers that her father also investigated supernatural events and that this was exactly what led to his death. Upon learning this, Fi feels betrayed by her mother who has been covering up the truth about her father. Additionally, Molly is possessed by Bricriu, the same Will o' the Wisp who did the same to Jack in season one. Fi uncovers that Will o' the Wisps or other dark powers may have been involved in the incident surrounding her father's death which police had assumed was an accident. In this episode Bricriu tried to kill a former firefighter who had been present at Rick's car crash and was aware that Fi's dad had been dead, with no apparent cause, before the car crashed. Following this episode, Fi has further contact with her father, as the answer to a troll's question – Faith – was revealed on her computer and a plethora of cell phones. Fi briefly time travels to her childhood, when her father was still alive, in episode 13, titled Fountain.

The season ends with Fi discovering her father's twin sister received encoded messages from him in her sleep. Once decoded the messages lead Fi to a rooftop where she is attacked by a three-headed demon and saved by the spirit of her father. He left her with a message that the spirit world was angry with her and would try to stop her investigation into the paranormal. At long last, now that the mystery around her father's death is solved, Fi is able to have a proper farewell with him. Due to a recasting of the main character in the next and final season, many DeLizia fans consider this a fulfilling finale.

Season 3 
Cara DeLizia, the actress who played Fi, chose to leave the show after the second season, but appeared in the first episode of Season 3 as a way of transitioning the series. The lead protagonist for the rest of the season and series is Annie, who is a friend of the family. Carey, first introduced in season 2, becomes a series regular. Due to Annie becoming the protagonist, there is a significant tonal shift in the series, in which it becomes more lighthearted, contains more singing, employs a bright color scheme, and introduces a romantic subplot.

The main arc of the story is the mystery behind Annie's spirit animal, a black panther who has protected her since she was a child. Annie insists that people exercise great respect when learning about Native American culture. When the mystery is unveiled, Annie finds out that when she saved a Native American man in the Amazon, his father returned the favor by shapeshifting into a panther and keeping an eye on Annie in order to help her out when she is in danger.

The returning characters have closure as well. Although Clu was bad at core subjects in high school, he is good at philosophy, and majors in it in college. He tours with the band during vacation times. Carey follows his dream of becoming a guitar player. Jack, who lost his love of singing when his father died, regains a desire to sing with the band. Annie expresses a desire for him to believe in the paranormal, and he slowly becomes more open-minded towards the paranormal.

Episodes

Main characters 

 Cara DeLizia as Fiona "Fi" Phillips (seasons 1–2; guest star, season 3) – Fi maintains a website called So Weird. On this website, she posts her strange experiences with a community that shares her belief in the paranormal. Fi has a vast knowledge and attraction to all things paranormal. In the episodes "Strangeling" and "Banshee," it is hinted that she is part witch on her grandmother's side. In the episode  "OOPA", it is shown that she has a psychic connection to an ancient computing device from Atlantis. Fi lost her father in a car accident when she was three years old. In "Strange Geometry", Fi learns that her father was obsessed with the same weird things that she investigates. The will-o'-the-wisp known as Bricriu says that this may have led to his death in "Destiny". Fi's father's death and its increasingly mysterious circumstances act as a double season-long story arc over seasons 1 and 2. She left at the beginning of season 3 to live with her aunt and try to have a "normal life".
 Mackenzie Phillips as Molly Phillips – Fi and Jack's mother, widow of Rick Phillips, and a singer-songwriter. She opened once in "Encore" instead of Fi. Molly had a bit of a rocky relationship with her father, apparently starting when she was a rebellious teenager. She wrote a song about him called "The Rock" in "Banshee" to make peace with him. She kept the knowledge that Rick also investigated paranormal activity secret from Fi, saying "he became obsessed with it". She doesn't share Fi's strong belief in the paranormal, but she does support her daughter. Bricriu possessed her in "Destiny" to stop Fi from learning the truth about her father's accident and supposedly to also protect her mother from the spirit world. But the part about protecting Fi is questionable since he goes so far as trapping a pyrophobiac mechanic (who pulled Rick from the car the day of his death) and Fi in a burning building.
 Patrick Levis as Jack Phillips – Although he is Fi's older brother, Jack doesn't believe in paranormal activity and is the series' most staunch skeptic. Jack is very protective of Fi, as well as Molly as seen in "Fathom." He once opened the show in the episode "Avatar" instead of Fi, and opened the episode "Dead Ringer" instead of Annie. Bricriu possessed him in "Will o' the Wisp" to supposedly "protect" Fi from others in the spirit world, others who didn't like her investigations of the paranormal. He meets his girlfriend Gabe in "Angels", whom he keeps in touch with long-distance and went to visit in "Fall".
 Erik von Detten as Clu Bell (seasons 1–2; guest star, season 3) – Carey's younger brother, Ned and Irene's son, Clu is more accepting of Fi's paranormal theories. She often takes him along when investigating. He got into college in "Mutiny". He tends to have a rather goofy laid-back attitude, much like his brother Carey but more so. Still, he can be rather responsible such as when he helped Jack study for his driver's license in "Rebecca".
 Belinda Metz as Irene Bell – Molly's band manager. She has a younger sister with whom she never got along after she washed her "ratty stuffed bunny" and made it into a "clean soft bunny", a brother-in-law named Kevin, and a young nephew named Danny, who pulled Clu, Fi, and Jack into his dreams because he wanted help to deal with "the monster" (it turned out he was having nightmares because of his parents constant fighting, something they resolved to try to fix for Danny's sake) in "Nightmare".
 Dave Ward as Ned Bell – Drives Molly's tour bus; he was possessed by a claustrophobic sea captain in "Mutiny". He went home to visit his childhood friend Sam, who was being haunted by a vision of their friend Pete, who had died in a bad fall over river rocks. He was Fi's, Clu's, and Jack's home school teacher while on the road. In "Troll", he mentions he has Viking ancestors.
 Eric Lively as Carey Bell (seasons 2–3) – Clu's older brother, he was introduced in "Siren". He goes along more with Fi's paranormal ideas, and sometimes comes up with his own, as shown in "Avatar". He dropped out of college and joined Molly's band against Irene's wishes in "Listen". 
 Alexz Johnson as Annie Thelen (season 3) – Family friend of the Phillips'. She moves in with the Phillips' after Fi leaves for her aunt's to try to have a "normal life". Fi gives Annie a ring that previously belonged to her father that serves as a gateway for Annie's adventure into the paranormal world. There is always a mysterious black panther around just as something 'weird' is happening, which she later finds out is her spirit guide.

Cast changes and guest appearances
 Despite many rumors, producers confirm that Cara DeLizia left after season two to pursue other projects before Disney had decided to revamp the show. DeLizia's departure was the first time that a Disney Channel original series' lead actor departed during its run (the only other series where this has occurred is Sonny with a Chance, whose lead actress Demi Lovato left due to health issues). In the season three episode "Earth 101," Fi's cameo appearance was done through past vocal footage and a look-alike stand-in. DeLizia had no part in the episode.
 Erik von Detten was unavailable during much of the show's second season, only appearing in 7 of its 26 episodes. Von Detten returned in the third season in several guest spots.
 Teryl Rothery played Irene Bell in the pilot episode "Family Reunion", before being permanently replaced by Belinda Metz.
 The Moffatts made a guest appearance in the episode "Destiny".
 SHeDAISY made a guest appearance in the episode "Listen".
 Bo Diddley appeared in the episode "Blues" as Frank.

Music of So Weird 
The series featured original songs sung by both Mackenzie Phillips and Alexz Johnson. Songs sung by Mackenzie Phillips included the theme "In the Darkness", "Another World", "Rebecca", "The Rock" and "Love is Broken". Each of the songs usually tied into the theme of the episode they were featured in. For example, "Rebecca" was featured in the episode "Rebecca" which dealt with Molly's former best friend of the same name who vanished when she was 13 years old. A compilation of Molly's songs was featured in the episode "Encore."

During seasons one and two, a music video that starts out with a talking scene between Jack and Clu and then Molly asks them and Fi to go to bed while they act jovial and happy, was aired. It featured over 62 clips from seasons one and two. It was the song "In the Darkness". It starts out with Jack and Clu fooling around, Clu howling and someone strumming a guitar. Molly comes to them in the RV and tells them it is time for her second show and that means bed. Fi closes her computer and says goodnight. She looks sad. Jack hugs Molly goodnight. Clu tells Molly to "knock em dead' or something or Break A Leg, Molly mocks his voice and says, "Thank you Clu" and shakes his hand. They leave. She goes out of the RV and starts to sing in a strange set.

"Last Night Blues," was the only occasion Cara DeLizia had to sing during her stint on the show. The song was supernaturally transferred to the characters from a murdered blues musician.

Season 3 mainly used the music of Alexz Johnson. One of Johnson's original songs, "Dream About You", was featured in the episode "Carnival." A music video by Alexz Johnson, "Shadows", was also featured near the end of the show's run on the Disney Channel.

The following is an incomplete listing of music from So Weird. With the exception of "Lorena" and occasional musical guest appearances, all music was original, created especially for the series.

Introduced in Season 1 
 "In the Darkness (Is the Light)"
Short Version #1 – featured in the opening theme of Season 1
Season 1 Version – featured in the official music video, Sight and Singularity
Short Version #2 – featured in the opening theme of Seasons 2 and 3
Season 2 Version – featured in Second Generation and Encore
Bricriu's Version – featured in Destiny
Music by Annmarie Montade
Lyrics by Jon Cooksey
Sung by Mackenzie Phillips

 "More Like a River"
Acoustic Version – featured in Memory
Piano Version – featured in OOPA
Guitar Version – featured in Encore
Music by Brent Belke
Lyrics by Jon Cooksey
Sung by Mackenzie Phillips

 "Rebecca"
Guitar Version – featured in Rebecca
Piano Version º featured in Rebecca
Acoustic Version – featured in Siren
Music by Annmarie Montade
Lyrics by Jon Cooksey
Sung by Mackenzie Phillips

 "She Sells"
Acoustic Version – featured in Tulpa, Drive and Second Generation
Original Version – featured in Drive and Encore
Music by Annmarie Montade
Lyrics by Jon Cooksey
Sung by Mackenzie Phillips

Introduced in Season 2 
 "Another World"
David Steele's Version – featured in Medium and Fall
Mackenzie Phillips' Version – featured in Encore
Music by Annmarie Montade
Lyrics by Jon Cooksey
Sung by Mackenzie Phillips/David Steele

 "New Math"
Featured in Listen, Blues, Fathom and The Muse
Music by Annmarie Montade
Lyrics by Jon Cooksey
Sung by Mackenzie Phillips

 "The Rock"
Featured in Banshee
Music by Annmarie Montade
Lyrics by Jon Cooksey
Sung by Mackenzie Phillips

 "Last Night Blues"
Featured in Blues
Music by Annmarie Montade
Lyrics by Jon Cooksey
Sung by Mackenzie Phillips
Alternate Version "Chicago Blues" sung by Roger Ridley

 "Origami"
Featured in Fathom
Music by Jeff Neill & Mark Scott
Lyrics by Jon Cooksey
Sung by Mackenzie Phillips

 "Love Is Broken"
Featured in Twins
Music by Annmarie Montade
Lyrics by Jon Cooksey
Arrangement by Jeff Neill & Mark Scott
Sung by Mackenzie Phillips

Introduced in Season 3 
 "One In A Million World"
Sung by Mackenzie Phillips and Alexz Johnson

 "To Dream About You"
Sung by Alexz Johnson

 "Never Give Up"
Sung by Alexz Johnson

 "What You Do (Voodoo)"
Music by Terry Frewer
Sung by Mackenzie Phillips

 "Thinkin' About Tomorrow"
Sung by Mackenzie Phillips

 "A Different Story"
Sung by Mackenzie Phillips

 "Push Me, Pull You"
Sung by Alexz Johnson

 "'Cause You're Watching Over Me (Shadows)"
Sung by Alexz Johnson

 "While I Stare"
Sung by Mackenzie Phillips

Other songs 
 "Lorena" (folk song fragment)
Sung by Mackenzie Phillips

 "Star-Dot-Star" (fictional jingle)
Sung by cast (and by gremlins)

 "Jack's Lullaby"
Sung by Patrick Levis

 "Questions"
Sung by Jewel Staite

 "Little Goodbyes"
Sung by SheDaisy

 "Misery"
Sung by The Moffatts

Book series

Novelizations of the first five episodes in Season 1 of So Weird were published by Disney Press as mass-market paperbacks, beginning with Family Reunion by Parke Godwin. The short-lived series ended with Strangeling by Cathy East Dubowski in 2000. The series has long-since fallen out of print, although used vintage copies of the books continue to appear on bookselling platforms.

Broadcast 
After 65 episodes, the Disney Channel ceased production of the show. Reruns of the series continued to be aired until September 2003 when So Weird was removed from the Disney Channel schedule altogether, and has not aired since.

On October 14, 2019, Disney included So Weird in the list of films and television series that will be available to watch on their streaming platform Disney+ on launch day, November 12, 2019. Having never been released on DVD, this marked the first time So Weird was available to watch legally in the U.S. since 2003. Within a month of its launch, the second season was removed from the service for undisclosed reasons, but was later added back on December 18, 2019.

References

External links 
 

1990s American science fiction television series
2000s American science fiction television series
1990s American teen drama television series
2000s American teen drama television series
1999 American television series debuts
2001 American television series endings
1990s Canadian science fiction television series
2000s Canadian science fiction television series
1990s Canadian teen drama television series
2000s Canadian teen drama television series
1999 Canadian television series debuts
2001 Canadian television series endings
UFO-related television
Disney Channel original programming
Cryptozoological television series
English-language television shows
Television series about fictional musicians
Television series about monsters
Television series about teenagers
Television series about urban legends
Television series about ghosts
Serial drama television series
American mystery television series
American supernatural television series
American thriller television series
Canadian mystery television series
Canadian supernatural television series
Canadian thriller television series
Television series by Disney
Celtic mythology in popular culture
Television shows filmed in Vancouver